Radiotelevisione svizzera di lingua italiana (RSI, abbreviated as RTSI until 28 February 2009) is a Swiss public broadcasting organisation, part of SRG SSR. RSI handles production and broadcasting of radio and television programs in Italian for Switzerland (Italian-speaking Switzerland). RSI's administrative headquarters are located in Via Canevascini in Lugano-Besso.

History
"Radio svizzera di lingua italiana" was established in 1925 as "Radio Monte Ceneri", originally named after the mountain where the transmitter was placed. After several years of experimental broadcast, in 1933 the "Società svizzera di Radiodiffusione" (Swiss Radio Broadcasting Corporation) began regular transmissions in Ticino and Grigioni. The intentions of its founders were to promote cohesion in the confederation while promoting the value of the Swiss Italian culture. In the 1930s and 1940s, when most of Switzerland's neighboring states were under fascism (Italian Fascism and National Socialism), Radio Monte Ceneri was the only Italian language radio free of censorship, becoming the only reliable voice for the Italian population and a prominent outlet for Italian intellectuals: during these years it hosted people like Benedetto Croce and Delio Tessa.

The first TV broadcasts date back to 1958, at first produced in studios in Zurich and transmitted with Italian subtitles. In 1961, with the foundation of Televisione svizzera di lingua italiana (TSI), the studios were relocated in Paradiso, near Lugano. This was eight years after the experimental debut of television in Zurich and Genève. The channel began broadcasting in colour in 1968.

During the 1970s, when Italian television was still under the RAI monopoly, Swiss television in Italian was the only alternative to the public network for Italians living in Lombardy and Piedmont: the signal reached the city of Milan. Some important personalities of Italian television, such as Corrado, Mina, Enzo Tortora and the founder of the first commercial television in Italy, Telebiella, Peppo Sacchi worked with TSI.

RSI launched two new thematic radio stations, a cultural one, Rete Due, in 1985 and another more youth-oriented, Rete Tre, in 1989.

In 1997 a second channel was created, called TSI 2. The first TSI channel thus was renamed TSI 1.

In December 2005, RSI began digital broadcasts using the DAB system on the Saint Gottard autoroute. On 26 July 2006 at 12:45, SRG SSR idée suisse interrupted analog broadcasting in Ticino making it the first all-digital canton of Switzerland This affected the Italians in northern Italy, as they were deprived of all the TSI channels, with the sole exception of those close to the frontier.

Logo history

Direction
General Director:
 Mario Timbal

Headquarters
The administrative headquarters of RSI are located in Via Canevascini in Lugano-Besso. RSI television studios are found in Comano, 5 km north of Lugano.

Operations

Radio
RSI's radio department is in charge of production and transmission radio programs in the Italian language for the Italian speaking Swiss. Its studios are located in Via Canevascini in Lugano-Besso. It was known as Radio svizzera di lingua italiana (RSI) until 2009.

 RSI Rete Uno – general programming
 RSI Rete Due – cultural, intellectual programming, classical music
 RSI Rete Tre – youth-oriented programming

The three networks can also be listened to via the Internet in streaming on the broadcaster's website. Some programs are distributed as podcasts and on Play RSI.

SRG currently uses two data streams (transponders 17 and 123) to transmit its radio programs via satellite. New technologies now allow greater efficiency in the exploitation of existing satellite capacity. Therefore, from 9 March, SRG will reconfigure its new transponder and transfer its 26 radio networks to transponder 123.

Transponder 17 will operate in parallel until the end of June and will then be deactivated. The audio quality will remain unchanged.

Television
RSI's television department is in charge of production and transmission of television programs in the Italian language for the Italian speaking Swiss. Its studios are found in Comano, 5 km north of Lugano. It was known as Televisione svizzera di lingua italiana (TSI) until 2009.

 RSI La 1
 RSI La 2

Swiss public broadcaster SRG terminated the digital terrestrial distribution of its TV channels (DTT) via DVB-T nationwide on 3 June 2019.
DTT viewers were informed about the switch-off, which was announced in September 2018, through a caption on the TV screens from January 2019.
SRG recommended affected households to switch to an alternative reception infrastructure, such as DTH satellite, cable, IPTV or internet streaming.

See also
 Monte Ceneri transmitter
 Television in Switzerland

References

External links

 RSI Official site 
 RSI podcast 
 DAB in Switzerland 
 Television 
 La storia della SSR 

Swiss Broadcasting Corporation
Television networks in Switzerland
Italian-language television networks
Radio in Switzerland
1925 establishments in Switzerland
Mass media in Lugano
Radio stations established in 1925
Television channels and stations established in 1958